Stanley A. Long (26 November 1933 – 10 September 2012) was an English exploitation cinema and sexploitation filmmaker. He was also a driving force behind the VistaScreen stereoscopic (3D) photographic company. He was a writer, cinematographer, editor, and eventually, producer/director of low-budget exploitation movies.

Career

Long began his career as a photographer with the RAF, and helped found the stereoscopic souvenir/collectible outfit VistaScreen with the Spring Brothers in 1956. Selling out to Weetabix in 1961, Long considered other outlets for his talents.

He went on to produce striptease shorts or "glamour home movies", as they were sometimes known, for the 8 mm market, under the banner of Stag Film Productions. Beginning in the late fifties, Long’s feature film career would span the entire history of the British sex film, and as such exemplifies its differing trends and attitudes. His work ranges from coy nudist films (Nudist Memories, 1959) to moralizing documentary (The Wife Swappers, 1970) to a more relaxed attitude to permissive material (Naughty!, 1971, On the Game, 1974), to out-and-out comedies at the end of the 1970s.

He made several sex comedy movies in the 1970s, the most successful being Adventures of a Taxi Driver (1976), Adventures of a Private Eye (1977) and Adventures of a Plumber's Mate (1978); these starred a host of talented comedy performers including Barry Evans, Diana Dors, Irene Handl, Harry H. Corbett, Liz Fraser and Fred Emney.

Like Norman J. Warren, Long also made horror films. He made the anthology movie Screamtime in 1983 and was due to film a Jo Gannon script entitled Plasmid, about albino mutants living in London’s Underground. While the film was never made, confusingly a tie-in novel of Plasmid was released.

Long was also the cameraman on several British horror movies of the 1960s, including The Blood Beast Terror, Repulsion (uncredited) and The Sorcerers. For the latter he was strapped to the top of a car to film one sequence.

Long retired from film directing in the early 1980s; however, he briefly returned to direct The Other Side of the Screen in 2006, a one-off documentary about various aspects of filmmaking. This was hosted by Paul Martin, star of Flog It!.

As an entrepreneur, he was the creator of Salon Productions and Alpha Film Distribution.

The "Adventures of" comedies were released to DVD on 2 June 2008. The following year several of his other sex films, On the Game, Sex and the Other Woman and This That and the Other were also released on DVD for the very first time.

Long was interviewed for the BBC's Balderdash and Piffle programme (broadcast 25 May 2007), and the British horror and comedy episodes of the British Films Forever series ("Magic, Murder and Monsters" broadcast 25 August 2007, "Sauce, Satire and Sillyness" broadcast 9 September 2007).

Simon Sheridan’s biography of Long - X-Rated - Adventures of an Exploitation Filmmaker - was published in July 2008.

Death
Stanley Long died in Buckinghamshire on 10 September 2012, at the age of 78, of natural causes.

Select credits
West End Jungle (1961)
Nudist Memories (1961)
Nudes of the World (1961)
Take Off Your Clothes and Live! (1963)
London in the Raw (1964)
Primitive London (1965)
Secrets of a Windmill Girl (1966)
This, That and the Other (1969)
Groupie Girl (1970)
The Wife Swappers (1970)
Naughty! (1971)
Bread (1971)
Sex and the Other Woman (1972)
On the Game (1974)
 Eskimo Nell (1975)
 It Could Happen to You (1975)
Adventures of a Taxi Driver (1976)
Adventures of a Private Eye (1977)
Adventures of a Plumber's Mate (1978)
Screamtime (1983)

See also
Derek Ford
Pete Walker (director)
Norman J. Warren
Robin Askwith

References

External links

Stanley Long's official website
X-rated comedies
Review of the Plasmid tie-in novel
Long directing Adventures of a Plumbers Mate

1933 births
2012 deaths
English film directors
English film producers
English screenwriters
English male screenwriters
20th-century English businesspeople